Attorney General Barlow may refer to:

Francis C. Barlow (1834–1896), Attorney General of New York
Stephen Steele Barlow (1818–1900), Attorney General of Wisconsin

See also
General Barlow (disambiguation)